The following is a bibliography of non-presidential U.S. political memoirs. Many of them were written by the stated author and one or more ghostwriters.

U.S. Supreme Court 
The Majesty of the Law : Reflections of a Supreme Court Justice (2003), by Sandra Day O'Connor, 102nd U.S. Supreme Court Justice, 1981–2006
Thurgood Marshall: His Speeches, Writings, Arguments, Opinions and Reminiscences (2001), by Thurgood Marshall, U.S. Supreme Court Justice, 1967–1991
My Beloved World (2003), by Sonia Sotomayor, U.S. Supreme Court Justice, 2009–Present

U.S. Cabinet

Secretary of State 
Hard Choices (2014), by Hillary Rodham Clinton, Secretary of State under President Obama 2009–2013
No Higher Honor: A Memoir of My Years in Washington (2011) by Condoleezza Rice, Secretary of State 2005–2009 and Assistant to the President for National Security Affairs 2001–2005
Crisis: The Anatomy of Two Major Foreign Policy Crises (2003), by Henry Kissinger, Secretary of State under Presidents Richard Nixon and Gerald Ford, 1973–1977
Madam Secretary: A Memoir (2003), by Madeleine Albright, Secretary of State under President Bill Clinton
Ending the Vietnam War : A History of America's Involvement in and Extrication from the Vietnam War (2002), by Henry Kissinger, Secretary of State under Presidents Richard Nixon and Gerald Ford, 1973–1977
Chances of a Lifetime (2001), by Warren Christopher, Secretary of State under President Bill Clinton, 1993–1997
Years of Renewal (2000), by Henry Kissinger, Secretary of State under Presidents Richard Nixon and Gerald Ford, 1973–1977
In the Stream of History: Shaping Foreign Policy for a New Era (1998), by Warren Christopher, Secretary of State under President Bill Clinton, 1993–1997
The Politics of Diplomacy: Revolution, War and Peace, 1989–1992 (1995), by James A. Baker, Secretary of State under President George H. W. Bush, 1989–1992
Turmoil and Triumph: My Years as Secretary of State (1993), by George P. Shultz, Secretary of State under President Ronald Reagan, 1982–1989
Inner Circles: How America Changed The World (1992), by Alexander Haig, Secretary of State under President Ronald Reagan, 1981–1982, and White House Chief of Staff under President Richard Nixon, 1973–1974
Hard Choices: Critical Years in America's Foreign Policy" (1983), by Cyrus Vance, Secretary of State under President Jimmy Carter, 1977-1980Years of Upheaval (1982), by Henry Kissinger, Secretary of State under Presidents Richard Nixon and Gerald Ford, 1973–1977The White House Years (1979) by Henry Kissinger, Secretary of State under Presidents Richard Nixon and Gerald Ford, 1973–1977As I Saw It (1990), by Dean Rusk, Secretary of State under Presidents John F. Kennedy and Lyndon B. Johnson, 1961-1969Present at the Creation: My Years in the State Department (1969), by Dean Acheson, Secretary of State under President Harry Truman, 1949–1953All in One Lifetime (1958), by James F. Byrnes, Secretary of State under President Harry Truman, 1945–1947The memoirs of Cordell Hull (1948; ASIN B0006D7AEA), by Cordell Hull, Secretary of State under President Franklin D. Roosevelt, 1933–1944Speaking Frankly (1947), by James F. Byrnes, Secretary of State under President Harry Truman, 1945–1947

 Secretary of the Treasury Stress Test: Reflections on Financial Crises (2014), by Timothy F. Geithner, Secretary of the Treasury under President Barack Obama, 2009–2013Dealing with China: An Insider Unmasks the New Economic Superpower (2015), by Henry Paulson, Secretary of the Treasury under President George W. Bush, 2006–2009On the Brink: Inside the Race to Stop the Collapse of the Global Financial System (2010), by Henry Paulson, Secretary of the Treasury under President George W. Bush, 2006–2009In an Uncertain World: Tough Choices from Wall Street to Washington (2003), by Robert E. Rubin, Secretary of the Treasury under President Bill Clinton, 1995–1999In History's Shadow: An American Odyssey (1993), by John Connally, former Secretary of the Treasury under President Richard Nixon, and Mickey HerskowitzFor the Record: From Wall Street to Washington (1988), by Donald Regan, Secretary of the Treasury, 1981–1985, and White House Chief of Staff, 1985–1987, under President Ronald Reagan

 Secretary of Defense 
A Sacred Oath: Memoirs of a Secretary of Defense During Extraordinary Times (2022), by Mark Esper, Secretary of Defense 2019-2020.Duty: Memoirs of a Secretary at War (2014), by Robert Gates, Secretary of Defense 2006–2011.Worthy Fights: A Memoir of Leadership in War and Peace (2014) by Leon Panetta, Secretary of Defense 2011-2013, Director of the CIA 2009-2011, White House Chief of Staff 1994-1997, Director of the OMB 1993–1994, Congressman 1977–1993.Star Spangled Security: Applying Lessons Learned over Six Decades Safeguarding America (2012) by Harold Brown, Secretary of Defense 1977–1981, and Joyce Winslow.Known and Unknown: A Memoir (2011) by Donald Rumsfeld, Secretary of Defense 1975–1977 and 2001–2006.Fighting for Peace: Seven Critical Years in the Pentagon (1990), by Caspar W. Weinberger, Secretary of Defense 1981–1987.The Essence of Security: Reflections in Office (1968), by Robert McNamara, Secretary of Defense 1961–1968.

 Other Cabinet positions Thirteenth Man: A Reagan Cabinet Memoir (1988), by Terrel H. Bell, Secretary of Education under President Ronald ReaganAdvising Ike : The Memoirs of Attorney General Herbert Brownell (1993), by Herbert Brownell, Attorney General under President Dwight D. Eisenhower, 1953–1957, and John P. BurkeInside: A Public and Private Life (2004), by Joseph A. Califano, Secretary of Health, Education, and Welfare under President Jimmy CarterArthur Flemming, Crusader at Large: A Memoir (1991), by Bernice Flemming; Arthur Flemming: Secretary of Health, Education, and Welfare under President Dwight D. EisenhowerJustice: The Memoirs of Attorney General Richard Kleindienst (1985), by Richard Kleindienst, Attorney General under President Richard Nixon, 1972–1973Locked in the Cabinet (1997), by Robert Reich, Secretary of Labor under President Bill ClintonLaw and Justice in the Reagan Administration: The Memoirs of an Attorney General (1991), by William French Smith, U.S. Attorney General under President Ronald Reagan, 1981–1985The Terrors of Justice: The Untold Side of Watergate (1985), by Maurice Stans, Secretary of Commerce under President Richard Nixon

 U.S. Cabinet-level administration offices 

 Administrator of the Environmental Protection Agency Politics, Pollution and Pandas: An Environmental Memoir (2003), by Russell E. Train, Administrator of the Environmental Protection Agency, 1973–1978

 Director of the Office of Management and Budget The Triumph of Politics: Why the Reagan revolution failed (1986), by David Alan Stockman, Director of the Office of Management and Budget under President Ronald Reagan

 White House Chief of Staff 
(For the former White House Chiefs of Staff who served in a more senior position, see above)The Haldeman Diaries: Inside the Nixon White House (1994), by H.R. Haldeman, White House Chief of Staff under President Richard NixonCrisis: The Last Year of the Carter Presidency (1982), by Hamilton Jordan, White House Chief of Staff under President Jimmy CarterNo Such Thing as a Bad Day: A Memoir (2001), by Hamilton Jordan, White House Chief of Staff under President Jimmy CarterChief of Staff: Lyndon Johnson and His Presidency (2004), by W. Marvin Watson, White House Chief of Staff under President Lyndon B. Johnson

 U.S. ambassadors The United States in Honduras, 1980–1981: An Ambassador's Memoir (2000), by Jack R. Binns, Ambassador to Honduras, 1980–1981Rogue Ambassador: An African Memoir (1997) by Smith Hempstone, Ambassador to Kenya, 1989–1993Madame Ambassador: The Shoemaker's Daughter (2002), by Mari-Luci Jaramillo, Ambassador to Honduras, 1977–1980American Diplomacy in Turkey: Memoirs of an Ambassador Extraordinary and Plenipotentiary (1984), by James W. Spain, Ambassador to Turkey, 1980–1981The Politics of Truth: Inside the Lies That Put the White House On Trial and Betrayed My Wife's CIA Identity: A Diplomat's Memoir (2004; New York: Carroll & Graf, 2005), by Joseph C. Wilson, IV, Ambassador to Gabon and São Tomé and Príncipe, 1992–1995

 Heads of federal agencies (sub-cabinet level)At the Center of the Storm : My Years at the CIA (2007), by George Tenet and Bill Harlow, Director of Central Intelligence 1997–2004My FBI : Bringing Down the Mafia, Investigating Bill Clinton, and Fighting the War on Terror (2005), by Louis J. Freeh, Director of the Federal Bureau of Investigation 1993–2001Full Faith and Credit: The Great S & L Debacle and Other Washington Sagas (2000), by L. William Seidman, FDIC/RTC chairman under Presidents Ronald Reagan and George H. W. BushFrom the Shadows: The Ultimate Insider's Story of Five Presidents and How They Won the Cold War (1996/2007) by Robert Gates, Director of Central Intelligence 1991–1993Command of the Seas (1989/2001) by John Lehman, Secretary of the Navy 1981–1987The Craft of Intelligence (1963), by Allen W. Dulles, Director of Central Intelligence 1953–1961

 White House staff positions 
(for White House Chief of Staff see "U.S. Cabinet-level administration offices" above)The Clinton Wars (2003), by Sidney Blumenthal, former advisor to President Bill ClintonNerve Center: Inside the White House Situation Room (2003), by Michael K. Bohn, former director of the Situation RoomAgainst All Enemies: Inside America's War on Terror (2004), by Richard A. Clarke, former National Security Council counterterrorism advisorTruth To Tell: Tell It Early, Tell It All, Tell It Yourself: Notes from My White House Education (2002), by Lanny J. Davis, Special Counsel to the President during Bill Clinton’s second term (1996–1998) and currently a member of the Privacy and Civil Liberties Board under President George W. BushTaking Heat: The President, the Press, and My Years in the White House (2005), by Ari Fleischer, former White House Press Secretary for President George W. Bush, 2001–2003Eyewitness to Power: The Essence of Leadership Nixon to Clinton (2003), by David Gergen, former advisor to Presidents Richard Nixon, Gerald Ford, Ronald Reagan, and Bill ClintonWhite House Daze: The Unmaking of Domestic Policy in the Bush Years (1998), by Charles Kolb, Assistant Deputy for Domestic Policy under President George H. W. BushA Political Education: A Washington Memoir (1972) by Harry McPherson, Special Counsel to President Lyndon B. JohnsonBehind the Oval Office: Getting Reelected Against All Odds (1998), by Dick Morris, former political strategist to President Bill ClintonWhat I Saw at the Revolution: A Political Life in the Reagan Era (1990), by Peggy Noonan, former speechwriter for Presidents Ronald Reagan and George H. W. BushThe Ring of Power: The White House Staff and its Expanding Role in Government (1988), by Bradley H. Patterson, Jr., former White House staff member under Presidents Dwight D. Eisenhower, Richard Nixon, and Gerald FordThe White House Staff: Inside the West Wing and Beyond (2000) by Bradley H. Patterson, Jr., former White House staff member under Presidents Dwight D. Eisenhower, Richard Nixon, and Gerald FordAll Too Human: A Political Education (1999), by George Stephanopoulos, senior advisor to President Bill ClintonPOTUS Speaks: Finding the Words that Defined the Clinton Presidency (2000), by Michael Waldman, former speechwriter to President Bill ClintonThe Greatest Communicator: What Ronald Reagan Taught Me About Politics, Leadership, and Life (2005), by Dick Wirthlin, former chief political strategist for President Ronald Reagan, and Wynton C. Hall
Remembering America: a voice from the sixties (1988) by Richard N. Goodwin, a speechwriter for John F. Kennedy, and Lyndon Bains Johnson. Also part of Robert Kennedy's and Eugene McCarthy's campaigns in 1968.The World As It Is: A Memoir of the Obama White House (2019) by Ben Rhodes, deputy national security advisor to President Barack Obama, overseeing the administration’s national security communications, speechwriting, public diplomacy, and global engagement programming, 2009–17

 Miscellaneous All's Fair: Love, War and Running for President (1994), by James Carville, former campaign strategist for Bill Clinton, and Mary Matalin, former campaign director for George H. W. Bush, with Peter Knobler
 Straight from the Heart: My Life in Politics and Other Places (1989), by Ann Richards, Governor of Texas, with Peter KnoblerA Fighting Chance, by Senator Elizabeth Warren.
 A Mayor's Life: Governing New York's Gorgeous Mosaic (2013), by David Dinkins, Mayor of New York City, with Peter KnoblerWhat a Party! My Life Among Democrats: Presidents, Candidates, Donors, Activists, Alligators, and Other Wild Animals'' (2007), by Terry McAuliffe, Governor of Virginia, with Steve Kettmann

See also 
 List of autobiographies by presidents of the United States
 List of memoirs by first ladies of the United States
 List of political career biographies
 U.S. representative bibliography (congressional memoirs)
 U.S. senator bibliography (congressional memoirs)

Notes

 
Political bibliographies
 
Memoirs
Political memoirs